Legislative elections were held in Romania on 9 December 2012. The Social Liberal Union (USL) of Prime Minister Victor Ponta won an absolute majority in both the Chamber of Deputies and the Senate. Despite the severe weather in parts of the country, the turnout was at 42%, slightly higher than the last legislative elections held in 2008 which saw a turnout of 39%.

The Social Liberal Union (USL) obtained a huge majority in both the Chamber of Deputies and the Senate, with 60% and 59% respectively of the votes and in MP mandates, a record number of 395 seats. Far behind, the Right Romania Alliance (ARD) came in second place with only 17% of the vote and 80 seats, losing about half of what they won in 2008.

The ARD was officially dissolved after the elections. People's Party – Dan Diaconescu (PP–DD) and the Democratic Alliance of Hungarians in Romania (UDMR/RMDSZ) were the only other political groups that won seats in the Senate. Several parties for ethnic minorities also received individual seats in the Chamber of Deputies.

Background

Protests 

Following weeks of demonstrations against austerity measures demanded by the International Monetary Fund for a multi-billion US dollar loan, Prime Minister Emil Boc resigned from his post on 6 February 2012. The opposition, represented by Social Liberal Union leaders Victor Ponta and Crin Antonescu, then called for early elections. However, as the three parties behind the government (PDL, UDMR, UNPR) still relied on a slight parliamentary majority, an interim solution was agreed with the opposition that the government could stay in power until the next elections, conditional of electing a political independent technocrat as the new prime minister. The former Foreign Intelligence Service Director Mihai Răzvan Ungureanu was appointed interim prime minister on 9 February as a result.

The government announced the intention to hold legislative and local elections at the same time, by lengthening the term of the local elected officials (Mayors, Local Councils, County Councils and County Councils Presidents). It was suspected the attempt to delay local elections were related to the fact, that massive street protests had erupted, and at the same time the Opposition political alliance Social Liberal Union went on strike in Parliament, pushing for early legislative elections to be called one or two weeks after local elections in June. Initially, the government proposed an election date in November 2012, but as the mayoral mandates expire in June 2012, this was ruled unconstitutional. The local elections were eventually held on 10 June, with an unexpected runoff and three repeated elections on 17 June.

Motion of no confidence 
The political alliance Social Liberal Union, at that time comprising the three parties PSD, PNL, and PC, initiated and succeeded to vote a motion of no confidence against Mihai Răzvan Ungureanu and his cabinet on 27 April 2012 after just two months in office. President Traian Basescu nominated Opposition leader and president of the Social Democratic Party, Victor Ponta as Prime minister.

Electoral system 
In May 2012, the new USL government passed an electoral law in parliament, which changed the election system to a single-round FPTP system without the 5% electoral threshold with extra seats for minorities, both ethnic minorities and Romanian minorities. However, after PDL, fearing poor results in the elections ahead because of it, appealed the Constitutional Court of Romania who invalidated the law on 27 June 2012 and reinstated the old one.
A consequence of this is that after the 2012 legislative elections the size of the new Parliament grew to a record total number of 588, an added 117 seats than in the last legislature: 39 supplementary Senate seats, and 97 supplementary Chamber of Deputies seats, including the 18 seats for the ethnic minorities parties and organisations.

Party standings and political alliances 

In late 2010, the PSD+PC Alliance broke up without affecting the MEP seat held by the PC. In January 2011, the National Liberal Party – PNL and the Conservative Party – PC formed the Centre Right Alliance – ACD. In February 2011, ACD together with the Social Democratic Party – PSD formed the Social Liberal Union – USL. Following the local election, PSD, and the National Union for the Progress of Romania – UNPR formed the Centre Left Alliance, thus UNPR joining USL in mid 2012.

For the 2012 local election PDL formed various county-level alliances with a wide range of parties, including UNPR. Following the presidential impeachment referendum it urged the formation of a political alliance with a number of minor political parties and foundations, such as New Republic led by Mihail Neamțu, and the centre-right Civic Initiative led by Mihai Răzvan Ungureanu. Eventually Ungureanu joined a minor party, Civic Force (FC), and was elected its president. The alliance registered at the Central Electoral Bureau was called Right Romania Alliance – ARD formed by PDL, PNȚ-CD, and FC.

Opinion polling 
The PDL centred ARD alliance was formed late after the 2012 Romanian presidential impeachment referendum. As a result, some opinion polls do not include the ARD. Opinion polls that show PDL do not show ARD.

UNPR joined USL in August–September 2012, in a sceptical environment. As a result, some opinion polls show both political entities. PNG-CD leader George Becali joined the PNL an runs backed by the USL in Bucharest. His former party did not propose any candidates for this election.

Candidates 

Out of the 12 contesting parties running for the Chamber of Deputies and the Senate, only three submitted a full list of candidates: Social Liberal Union (USL), Right Romania Alliance (ARD), and the Democratic Alliance of Hungarians in Romania (UDMR/RMDSZ). People's Party - Dan Diaconescu (PP-DD) submitted a list with one candidate less than all the available colleges. Only one independent candidate decided to run for the Senate and 12 for the Chamber of Deputies. There were 18 national minorities associations proposing one candidate each for the Chamber of Deputies.

Results 

The Social Liberal Union (USL) maintained majority in both the Chamber of Deputies and the Senate.

Senate

Chamber of Deputies

Local referendums 
Two local non-binding referendums were also organized on 9 December, concerning environmental issues.

The first one took place in Alba county and people were asked whether they were in favor or against the Roșia Montană mining project. Although 62% of those who voted voiced support for the controversial project, the referendum did not meet the required turnout of 50%, as only 43,2% of voters turned up.

The second referendum was held in the communes of Limanu, Costinești as well as in the city of Mangalia and asked voters to say whether they were in favor or against the use, by Chevron, of shale gas extraction by means of hydraulic fracturing. This referendum failed to meet the required turnout as well.

Incidents 
Although a report by the OSCE stated the elections were administered "professionally and efficiently", the electioneering, initiated on 9 November and ended on 8 December, was not without incidents.

Dan Diaconescu, candidate from PP-DD in the same college of Chamber of Deputies in Târgu Jiu with Prime Minister Victor Ponta, is investigated for electoral bribery. Authorities were notified after PSD representatives within Gorj County Council filed a complaint regarding the distribution of food and the organization of an electoral spectacle before the electioneering. According to the Emergency Ordinance issued on 6 November by Ponta Cabinet, offering food, drink and money in the campaign is illegal.

On 11 November, an old man from the commune of Mătăsari (Gorj County) had a heart attack shortly after a discussion in contradictory with PDL deputy Constantin Severus Militaru. PDL deputy said that the old man was very indignant because his pension was not recalculated, although he had worked all his life in mining.

The President of PDL Vrancea, Alin Trășculescu, was caught in the act by anticorruption prosecutors while receiving €50,000 from a businessman in the form of bribe. He was detained for 24 hours for allegations of lobbyism, instigation to false and incitement to the misdemeanor of money laundering. Alin Trășculescu was under the supervision of National Anticorruption Department for two years. He claimed he could get contracts with the State, from the Ministry of Development and Tourism, led then by Elena Udrea.

Notes

References

External links

Parliamentary elections in Romania
Romania
Romania
Legislative